Torres Airport , formerly SBTR, is the airport serving Torres, Brazil.

It is operated by DAP.

Airlines and destinations

No scheduled flights operate at this airport.

Access

See also

List of airports in Brazil

References

External links

Airports in Rio Grande do Sul